Coleophora luteolella is a moth of the family Coleophoridae. It is found in Spain, Portugal, France, Sardinia, Italy, Sicily, Greece, Crete, Cyprus, Morocco, Afghanistan and Asia Minor.

References

luteolella
Moths described in 1880
Moths of Europe
Moths of Asia